Elyaz Zidane Fernández (born 26 December 2005) is a French professional footballer who plays as a defender for Real Madrid Juvenil B.

Early life 
Elyaz Zidane was born on 26 December 2005 in Marseille. He is the youngest son of former French footballer Zinedine Zidane.  Elyaz is the last of four brothers, and all of them – Enzo, Luca, and Théo – are footballers who developed at the youth academy of Real Madrid. Elyaz is of Spanish descent through his mother, and of Algerian descent through his father.

Club career 
Elyaz started his career at CD Canillas, before joining La Fábrica in 2013.

He went through all the levels of the youth academy, already showing his skills with several goals in the Juvenil classicos. He started playing with the under-19 during the 2021–22 season.

International career
Also eligible for the Spanish selection through his mother, Zidane Fernández is a youth international for France, having made his debut with the France under-17 team, in October 2021. Having already scored two goals with the bleuets, including one on his debut, he even captained his side for a friendly against Spain in 2022.

In April 2022, he was selected with France for the 2022 Under-17 Euro.

Style of play
A left-footed defender, Elyaz Zidane is described as a physical player with a good reading of the game. He is able to play both as a left-back or a central defender.

Honours
France U17
UEFA European Under-17 Championship: 2022

References

External links

2005 births
Living people
Footballers from Marseille
French footballers
France youth international footballers
French sportspeople of Algerian descent
French people of Spanish descent
Association football defenders